Kharvas is an Indian milk pudding made from cow or buffalo colostrum, the first form of milk produced within one or two days of giving birth. It originates in the western Indian state of Maharashtra. It is also popular in the states of Karnataka (Ginnu Haalu in Kannada) and Andhra Pradesh (Junnu Paalu in Telugu). It is prepared by steaming a mix of colostrum, milk, and jaggery or sugar until it coagulates into a jiggling solid. Cardamom, saffron, nutmeg or sesame is added for flavoring.
It's rich in Proteins.

References 

Indian desserts
Indian confectionery
Milk dishes